Trevor Gillies (born January 30, 1979) is a Canadian former professional ice hockey player. He has played in the National Hockey League (NHL) with both the Mighty Ducks of Anaheim and New York Islanders. Gillies was known for being an enforcer, as evidenced by his NHL career statistics of 57 games with only three points and 261 penalty minutes. Gillies was also known for his distinctive horseshoe moustache during his time with the Islanders.

Playing career

Undrafted, Gillies played junior hockey in the Ontario Hockey League. In 1999–2000 Gillies made his professional debut with the Mississippi Sea Wolves in the East Coast Hockey League. With limited offensive ability Gillies plied his trade between the ECHL and American Hockey League (AHL) for five years before signing an NHL contract with the New York Rangers on July 20, 2004.

Prior to the 2005–06 season and in his second year with the Rangers affiliate, the Hartford Wolf Pack, Gillies was traded from the Rangers to the Mighty Ducks of Anaheim for Steve Rucchin on August 5, 2005. He was assigned to AHL affiliate, the Portland Pirates, and played in one NHL game for the Ducks, recording 21 penalty minutes in 2 minutes, 40 seconds of ice time.

On July 2, 2007, Gillies was signed by the Carolina Hurricanes to a one-year contract. Gillies never played a regular season game with the Hurricanes, as he was assigned to the Albany River Rats.

On September 14, 2009, Gillies signed with the Bridgeport Sound Tigers of the AHL for the 2009–10 season. After 18 games with the Tigers, he had accumulated 123 penalty minutes, and went on to be signed by NHL affiliate, the New York Islanders, on January 28, 2010. On March 14, 2010, Gillies scored his first NHL point, when he assisted on a Tim Jackman goal in a 4-2 victory over the Toronto Maple Leafs. Gillies re-signed with the Islanders on a one-year contract through to the end of the 2010–2011 season on April 15, 2010.

On February 12, 2011, Gillies was suspended nine games by the NHL for an incident which occurred in a February 11, 2011 game against the Pittsburgh Penguins. During the third period of the game, Gillies elbowed Penguins' forward Eric Tangradi in the face, punched him several times while he was down on the ice, and proceeded to taunt him from the dressing room hallway. Tangradi suffered concussion like symptoms and remained out of the Penguins line-up indefinitely. In his first game back from the suspension, Gillies was ejected for a hit on Cal Clutterbuck in a game against the Minnesota Wild on March 2, 2011. After an in-person hearing, Gillies was suspended for 10 games for the incident. After playing in only three games to start the 2011–12 season Gillies was placed on waivers on October 31, 2011.

On June 19, 2012, Gillies opted to forgo North American free agency and signed a one-year contract to play with Vityaz Chekhov of the Russian Kontinental Hockey League.

On August 28, 2013, Gillies signed a contract with Helsinki IFK in the Finnish SM-Liiga for the 2013–14 season. On November 4, 2013, Helsinki IFK terminated the contract with Gillies. During his time on HIFK he played three Finnish Liiga matches and four European Trophy matches.

On October 10, 2014, after signing with the Adirondack Flames, Gillies slammed the face of Rochester Americans' William Carrier into the ice, receiving a 12-game suspension.

On September 18, 2015, Gillies continued his career by signing a one-year ECHL contract with the South Carolina Stingrays.

On August 28, 2018, Gillies announced his retirement from professional hockey.

Career statistics

References

External links

1979 births
Living people
Abbotsford Heat players
Adirondack Flames players
Albany River Rats players
Augusta Lynx players
Bridgeport Sound Tigers players
Canadian ice hockey left wingers
Greensboro Generals players
Hartford Wolf Pack players
HC Vityaz players
HIFK (ice hockey) players
Lowell Lock Monsters players
Mighty Ducks of Anaheim players
Mississippi Sea Wolves players
New York Islanders players
North Bay Centennials players
Orlando Solar Bears (ECHL) players
Oshawa Generals players
Peoria Rivermen (ECHL) players
Portland Pirates players
Providence Bruins players
Richmond Renegades players
Sarnia Sting players
South Carolina Stingrays players
Springfield Falcons players
Undrafted National Hockey League players
Worcester IceCats players
Ice hockey people from Ontario
Sportspeople from Cambridge, Ontario
Canadian expatriate ice hockey players in Finland
Canadian expatriate ice hockey players in Russia
Canadian expatriate ice hockey players in the United States